Condorcanqui is a province of the Amazonas Region, Peru. It was created by law 23832 of May 18, 1984, based on territories of the province of Bagua, covering the basins of the rivers Santiago, Cenepa and Marañon. The province was named in honor to Tupac Amaru II

Its principal route is the fluvial one, it lasts three days of navigation to come to Santa Maria de Nieva, capital of the province, furrowing the waters of the Marañón river.

Political division

Condorcanqui is divided into three districts, which are:

Places of interest 
 Ichigkat muja - Cordillera del Condor National Park
 Santiago-Comaina Reserved Zone

See also 
 Nieva River

Condorcanqui Province